James "Maxie" McCann (born 4 March 1934) is a former soccer player from Dublin, Ireland.

McCann joined Shamrock Rovers in 1954 and made his debut on 10 April in a 2–0 win against Bohemians at Dalymount Park having signed the previous week. He scored a hat-trick in his second senior game.

He played for Shamrock Rovers as a winger. He played in European competition for the Milltown club, scoring in a 3–2 defeat for Rovers against Manchester United in a 1957 European Cup preliminary round tie at Old Trafford.

This goal was the first ever scored in European competition by a player representing an Irish club. In total he made two appearances for Rovers in Europe and scored 46 League and 7 FAI Cup goals during his time at Glenmalure Park. He also represented the League of Ireland XI four times scoring three goals.

He won his one and only senior cap for the Republic of Ireland national football team on 25 November 1956, scoring the third goal in a 3–0 win over world champions Germany at Dalymount Park. He won two Republic of Ireland B national football team caps in 1958 scoring the winner in Iceland on his debut.

He shared his benefit with Tommy Hamilton against Sunderland at Dalymount Park on 30 April 1962.

His son Ray played for Bohemian F.C. in the 1980s. Of his other sons, Shay had a long career playing in the Athletic Union League, David (Maxie) played his schoolboy football at Belvo, part of the first Belvo team to win an A league in the D.D.S.L, then went on to Leinster Senior and League of Ireland and youngest son Paul played for Sheriff Y.C. His grandson Alan McCann played for St Patrick's Athletic F.C. before moving into coaching where he is now at Reading United AC in the US.

In February 2008 McCann, and Liam Hennessy were invited to the Munich commemoration at Manchester United.

Sources
 The Hoops by Paul Doolan and Robert Goggins
 Shamrock Rovers programme 29 August 2008

Footnotes

Association footballers from County Dublin
Republic of Ireland association footballers
Republic of Ireland international footballers
Republic of Ireland B international footballers
Shamrock Rovers F.C. players
Dundalk F.C. players
League of Ireland players
Living people
1934 births
League of Ireland XI players
Drumcondra F.C. players
Transport F.C. players
Association football wingers